Georg Arthur Jensen (31 August 1866 in Rådvad – 2 October 1935 in Copenhagen) was a Danish silversmith and founder of Georg Jensen A/S (also known as Georg Jensen Sølvsmedie).

Early life
Born in 1866, Jensen was the son of a knife grinder in the town of Raadvad, just to the north of Copenhagen. Jensen began his training in goldsmithing at the age of 14 in Copenhagen. His apprenticeship with the firm Guldsmed Andersen, ended in 1884, and this freed Georg to follow his artistic interests.

In 1884 he became a journeyman and in 1887 he enrolled at the Royal Danish Academy of Fine Arts (Kongelige Danske Kunstakademi), where he studied sculpture with Theobald Stein. He graduated in 1892 and began exhibiting his work. After graduation he started studying ceramics with Joachim Petersen (1870–1943).

Although his ceramic sculptures were well received, making a living as a fine artist proved difficult and he turned his hand to the applied arts: first as a modeller at the Bing & Grøndahl porcelain factory and, beginning in 1898, with a small pottery workshop he founded in partnership with Christian Petersen. Again the work was well received, but the sales were not strong enough to support Jensen, now a widower, and his two young sons.

Career
Jensen made his first piece of jewelry in 1899, a silver and silver and gilt "Adam and Eve" belt buckle. In 1901, Jensen abandoned ceramics and began again as a silversmith and designer with the master, Mogens Ballin. This led Jensen to make a landmark decision, when in 1904, he risked what small capital he had and opened his own little silversmithy at 36 Bredgade in Copenhagen.

Jensen's training in metalsmithing along with his education in the fine arts allowed him to combine the two disciplines and revive the tradition of the artist craftsman. Soon, the beauty and quality of his Art Nouveau creations caught the eye of the public and his success was assured. The Copenhagen quarters were greatly expanded and before the end of the 1920s, Jensen had opened retail in Berlin (1909), London (1921), and New York City (1924). The New York retail store, Georg Jensen Inc. (New York, NY),  was founded and operated independently as a family business by Frederik Lunning, a successful salesman of Georg Jensen products first in Odense, then in Copenhagen. The first store, 1924-1935, was incorporated as Georg Jensen Handmade Silver, followed in 1935-1978 by the large Fifth Avenue department store  selling many goods aside from Jensen silver, incorporated as Georg Jensen Inc. 

In 1930, Adda Husted Andersen worked for Jensen in New York City, enameling homewares.

Museum collections and exhibitions
During his lifetime, Jensen's work was collected by museums including the Danish Museum for Decorative Art and the Museum Folkwang.

In 2005, the Bard Graduate Center in New York presented an exhibition entitled, Georg Jensen Jewelry.

Georg Jensen brand signs
When he was twenty Georg Jensen signed his first sculpture with "My Father" (1887). In 1894 he used the markings GJ as brandsign and from 1899 he often used GJ. In most cases the year was put next to the brand sign.

Brand signs of Georg Jensen

Brand signs from the designers of Georg Jensen

Family tree Georg Jensen

References

Sources
Georg Jensen, Ib (1999 & 2004) ”Der var engang en sølvsmed - Historien om min far Georg Jensen” (Once there were a silversmith – the story of my father). By Ib Georg Jensen, Georg Jensen's youngest son and published in Danish by publishing house Aschehoug, Denmark, in 1999 (1st Edition) , 227 pages. Also published in Danish by publishing house Forum (Forlaget Forum), Denmark, in 2004 (2nd Edition) , 227 pages.

External links
Official Georg Jensen Page
The Georg Jensen Society
 Georg Jensen  Background information on the history and design drafts at the design agency TAGWERC 

Danish designers
Danish silversmiths
20th-century Danish metalsmiths
1866 births
1935 deaths
Art Nouveau designers
People from Lyngby-Taarbæk Municipality
Designers from Copenhagen
20th-century Danish sculptors
Male sculptors
19th-century sculptors
Danish male artists
Burials at Hellerup Cemetery
20th-century Danish male artists